Nadja Obrist (born 4 November 1972) is an Austrian Paralympic alpine skier. She represented Austria in Paralympic Alpine skiing at the 1994 Paralympic Winter Games in Lillehammer and 1998 Paralympic Winter Games in Nagano. She won five medals: three medals silver and two bronze.

Career 
At the 1994 Paralympic Winter Games in Lillehammer, Norway, Obrist won three medals: two silver medals, in the downhill LW6/8, and super-G LW6/8, and a bronze in the giant slalom LW6/8. She placed fourth in the slalom LW6/8. 

At the 1998 Paralympic Winter Games, at Nagano Japan , Obrist won silver in the slalom LW3,4,5/7,6/8,  and bronze in the downhill LW3,4,6/8. She finished fourth in the giant slalom, and sixth in the super-G LW3,4,5 / 7,6 / 8.

References 

1972 births
Living people
Paralympic alpine skiers of Austria
Austrian female alpine skiers
Alpine skiers at the 1994 Winter Paralympics
Alpine skiers at the 1998 Winter Paralympics
Medalists at the 1994 Winter Paralympics
Medalists at the 1998 Winter Paralympics
Paralympic silver medalists for Austria
Paralympic bronze medalists for Austria